is a Japanese television drama series that first aired on TV Asahi in 1979.

References

1979 Japanese television series debuts
1980 Japanese television series endings
Japanese drama television series
TV Asahi television dramas